Kallur Vadakkummuri  is a village in Thrissur district in the state of Kerala, India.

Demographics
 India census, Kallur Vadakkummuri had a population of 23488 with 11480 males and 12008 females.
Schools:Saraswathy Vilasam LPSchool, Annanadu may be the oldest in this village. It is a small, aided, single management school with 8 divisions. Present Manager is Sri. Sasi Chankramath.Smt.Mini.V.P.is the present headmistress. Nearly 150 students studying.

Kallur Vadakkummuri is falling under the Grama Panchayat Kadukutty. Grama Panchayat Office is situated at the other side of the Chalakudy River. Kallur Vadakkummuri is connected to NH47 through Palayam Parambu Bridge and Annamanada Pulikkakadavu Bridge over the Chalakudy River.

There are so many old Hindu Temples in Kallur of which Gokunnathu (Shiva Temple), Chempikkadathu (Bhagavathi Temple) and Pathippathrikka (Shree Krishna Temple) are famous.

References

Villages in Thrissur district